Evan Smith is an American playwright.

Life
Smith was born in Savannah, Georgia. He attended Vassar College and received an MFA from the Yale School of Drama. His plays have been published by Grove Press and Dramatists Play Service.

Awards
 2002  Whiting Award

Works
 Remedial English, Playwrights Horizons (1986).
 The Uneasy Chair, Playwrights Horizons (1998).
 Servicemen, The New Group (2001).
 Psych, Playwrights Horizons (2001).
 Daughters of Genius, 1812 Productions, Philadelphia (2006).
 Rich Boyfriend, The New Group (2008).
 The Savannah Disputation, Playwrights Horizons (2009).

References

External links
Profile at The Whiting Foundation
Article at Playbill.com

20th-century American dramatists and playwrights
Living people
21st-century American dramatists and playwrights
Year of birth missing (living people)
Writers from Savannah, Georgia
Vassar College alumni
Yale School of Drama alumni